Helmut Richert (born 23 July 1941) is a retired German football striker and later manager.

References

1941 births
Living people
German footballers
TSV 1860 Munich players
Bayer 04 Leverkusen players
Fortuna Düsseldorf players
Association football forwards
German football managers
SSV Jahn Regensburg managers
Holstein Kiel managers
FC Vaduz managers
German expatriate football managers